John of Bar (1380  – 21 October 1415, Agincourt) was lord of Puisaye.  He was the son of Robert I of Bar and Marie de France.  He was killed at the battle of Agincourt alongside his brother Edward III and his nephew Robert.

Sources
 Georges Poull, La Maison souveraine et ducale de Bar, 1994
 Barbara Tuchman, A Distant Mirror, 1978, Alfred A. Knopf, New York

1380 births
1415 deaths
People of the Hundred Years' War